St Kieran's is a divisional Gaelic football team from Kerry, Ireland. The team participates in competitions organised by Kerry GAA county board. The team consists of players from clubs in both North and East Kerry and Tralee District board.

Member clubs
The clubs are:
 Cordal
 Currow
 Scartaglin
 Brosna
 Castleisland Desmonds
 Knocknagoshel
 Ballymacelligott

Honours
 Kerry Senior Football Championship (1): 1988
 Kerry Minor Football Championship (1): 1994
 Kerry Under-21 Football Championship  (0): (runners-up in 1996, 2007, 2013, 2014)

References

Divisional boards of Kerry GAA
Gaelic games clubs in County Kerry